Wilhelm Adolf Schmidt (26 September 1812, Berlin – 10 April 1887) was a German historian.

Biography 
He studied at Berlin, in 1839 becoming a lecturer there, and in 1845 professor.  In 1851, he became professor for history at the University of Zürich; nine years, he went to the University of Jena, where he remained for the rest of his life. He was a member of the Frankfurt Parliament in 1848, and of the German Reichstag from 1874 to 1876.

Works

German history
This is his main body of work, mostly limited to the 19th century.  The most important are:
Geschichte der Denk- und Glaubensfreiheit im ersten Jahrhundert der Kaiserherrschaft und des Christentums (1847)
Preussens deutsche Politik (Berlin, 1850, and other editions)
Geschichte der preussisch-deutschen Unionsbestrebungen (Berlin, 1851)
Zeitgenössische Geschichten: I. Frankreich von 1815 bis 1830. II. Oesterreich von 1830 bis 1848 (Berlin, 1859)
Elsass und Lothringen (Leipzig, 1859 and 1870)
Geschichte der deutschen Verfassungsfrage während der Befreiungskriege und des Wiener Kongresses (Stuttgart, 1890), which was published after his death by A Stern.
He edited the 8th issue of Karl Friedrich Becker's Weltgeschichte, 22 vols. (Leipzig, 1874–79).

Non-German History
Tableaux de la Révolution Française publiés sur les papiers inédits du département de la police secrete de Paris (Leipzig, 1867-1870)
Pariser Zustände während der Revolutionszeit (Jena, 1874—1876), translated into French by Paul Viollet (Paris, 1880—1885)
Das Perikleische Zeitalter (Jena, 1877—1879)
Handbuch der griechischen Chronologie (Jena, 1888)
Abhandlungen zur alten Geschichte (Leipzig, 1888).

See also
 The Revolutions of 1848 in the German states

Notes

References
  This work in turn cites:
 H. Landwehr, Zur Erinnerung an Adolf Schmidt (Berlin, 1887).
 

1812 births
1887 deaths
Politicians from Berlin
People from the Province of Brandenburg
German Protestants
National Liberal Party (Germany) politicians
Members of the Frankfurt Parliament
Members of the 2nd Reichstag of the German Empire
Academic staff of the University of Zurich
Academic staff of ETH Zurich
Academic staff of the University of Jena